The canton of Saint-Nicolas-de-la-Grave is a French former administrative division in the department of Tarn-et-Garonne. It had 6,520 inhabitants (2012). It was disbanded following the French canton reorganisation which came into effect in March 2015.

The canton comprised the following communes:

 Saint-Nicolas-de-la-Grave
 Angeville
 Castelferrus
 Castelmayran
 Caumont
 Cordes-Tolosannes
 Coutures
 Fajolles
 Garganvillar
 Labourgade
 Lafitte
 Montaïn
 Saint-Aignan
 Saint-Arroumex

References

Former cantons of Tarn-et-Garonne
2015 disestablishments in France
States and territories disestablished in 2015